Arivaca linella is a species of snout moth described by Jay C. Shaffer in 1968. It is found in the US states of Arizona and New Mexico.

The forewings are brown anterior to cell.

References

Moths described in 1968
Anerastiini
Moths of North America